Kopexil (INCI name diaminopyrimidine oxide, trade name Aminexil) is a chemical compound similar to minoxidil. Minoxidil was originally used to treat high blood pressure; a side effect was increased body hair. Both compounds have been used for therapy of alopecia. Kopexil is not approved for use as a drug in the United States or in Europe.

Chemical structure
Kopexil is an N-oxide, a group of substances in which the nitrogen atom of a tertiary amine is oxidized. The compound can exist in two tautomeric forms.

Mechanism of action
The exact mechanism of action of kopexil is unknown. There is no proof of therapeutic effect for kopexil against alopecia.

References

Amine oxides
Aminopyrimidines
Antihypertensive agents
Enamines
Guanidines
Human hair